The 2014–15 Savannah State Tigers basketball team represented Savannah State University during the 2014–15 NCAA Division I men's basketball season. The Tigers, led by tenth year head coach Horace Broadnax, played their home games at Tiger Arena and were members of the Mid-Eastern Athletic Conference. They finished the season 9–22, 5–11 in MEAC play to finish in a tie for 11th place. They lost in the first round of the MEAC tournament to Delaware State.

In 2019, three wins were vacated due to academic certification errors.

Roster

Schedule

|-
!colspan=9 style="background:#CC5500; color:#002395;"| Exhibition

|-
!colspan=9 style="background:#CC5500; color:#002395;"| Non-conference regular season

|-
!colspan=9 style="background:#CC5500; color:#002395;"| MEAC regular season

|-
!colspan=9 style="background:#CC5500; color:#002395;"| MEAC tournament

References

Savannah State Tigers basketball seasons
Savannah State
Savannah State Tigers basketball team
Savannah State Tigers basketball team